Richard Liversedge (31 August 1940 – 19 January 2022) was a British luger. He competed at the 1968 Winter Olympics, the 1972 Winter Olympics and the 1976 Winter Olympics.

References

External links
 

1940 births
2022 deaths
British male lugers
Olympic lugers of Great Britain
Lugers at the 1968 Winter Olympics
Lugers at the 1972 Winter Olympics
Lugers at the 1976 Winter Olympics
People from Cockermouth
Sportspeople from Cumbria